Alicia Dal Monte Campuzano (born 28 June 1977), better known by her stage name as Alika, is an Uruguayan–Argentine rapper, singer, songwriter, and reggae musician. She is better known for heading the reggae act Alika & Nueva Alianza.

Background
Alicia Dal Monte Campuzano was born on 28 June 1977 in Montevideo, Uruguay, daughter of a Paraguayan mother and a Uruguayan father. When she was six years old, her family moved to Argentina and settled in the town of El Jagüel, Buenos Aires Province. Later in life, she would take up residence in San Martín, Buenos Aires.

Musical career
In 1994, she formed the duo  alongside Malena D'Alessio. The duo became one of the earliest female rap bands in Argentina and Latin America in general. In 1995, the duo were recognized as the "Revelation Band" by Clarín's Sí magazine. Actitud María Marta released a single album, Acorralar a la Bestia, in 1996 under Polygram records. Alika would leave the duo following their album's release, and subsequently grew closer to reggae and Rastafari culture.

In 1999, she started her solo project, inspired by Rastafari philosophy. Her lyrics reflected themes of respect, dignity, oppression under the Western capitalist system, realizations of self-worth, and life in the Third World in general and working-class neighborhoods in particular. Alongside MC Boomer, among other producers, she produced her first solo album No Dejes que te paren (released 2001 under Indie) in Chile. 2001 was also the year she began performing live. In 2003, she released Sin Intermediarios, and, in 2006, she released Razón Meditación Acción.

In 2013, her collaboration with Argentine cumbia band La Liga – "Yo Tengo el Don" – was featured in the videogame GTA V, as part of the songs available on the East Los FM radio station.

Discography
With Actitud María Marta
 Acorralar a la bestia (1996)

As a solo artist
No dejes que te paren (2001)
Sin Intermediarios (2003)
Razón Meditación Acción (2006)
Educate Yourself (2008)
Mad Professor Meets Alika (2009)
Alika Live Niceto Club (2011)
Unidad y Respeto Mixtape (2011)
Dub Yourself (Remixes) (2012)
Mi Palabra Mi Alma (2014)

References

External links

 

1977 births
Living people
Musicians from Montevideo
Uruguayan people of Paraguayan descent
Uruguayan people of African descent
Uruguayan emigrants to Argentina
Argentine people of Paraguayan descent
Argentine people of Uruguayan descent
Afro-Argentine musicians
Argentine reggae musicians
Argentine singer-songwriters
Argentine women rappers
Reggae musicians
21st-century Argentine women singers
21st-century Uruguayan women singers